Hait may refer to:

 Hoit, Tajikistan
 Hit, Qasr-e Qand, a village in Iran
 Benjamin Hait House in Stamford, Connecticut, United States
 Paul Hait (born 1940), American swimmer 
 Thaddeus Hait Farm in Plattekill, New York, United States